The 2005 Auto Club 500 was a NASCAR Nextel Cup Series stock car race held on February 27, 2005 at California Speedway in Fontana, California. Contested over 250 laps on the 2-mile (3.23 km) asphalt D-shaped oval, it was the second race of the 2005 Nextel Cup Series season. Greg Biffle of Roush Racing won the race, his first win of the season. Jimmie Johnson finished second and Kurt Busch finished third.

Background
The track's turns are banked from fourteen degrees, while the front stretch, the location of the finish line, is banked at eleven degrees. Unlike the front stretch, the backstraightaway is banked at three degrees.

Qualifying

Summary
Magic Johnson gave the command for drivers to start their engines, and California governor Arnold Schwarzenegger waved the green flag, which was taken by 19-year-old Kyle Busch. Busch became the youngest driver to ever take the green flag on pole position. Busch was still leading after the first lap, with Brian Vickers in second place.

Before the race, Greg Biffle had promised to reporters and commentators that he would have the lead within 5 laps. He also happened to promise to win the race.

Greg Biffle took the lead in only 4 laps, followed by Matt Kenseth in second place, and Biffle was still in the lead after 26 laps, when Bill Elliott went into the wall. Biffle was immediately overtaken by Matt Kenseth after the restart. Dale Earnhardt Jr. pitted on lap 38, going down a lap, with problems on his left front tire. Carl Edwards took over the lead around lap 46.

On lap 59, Earnhardt – already a lap down – had another problem with his left front tire and the debris brought out the caution a lap later. Ultimately Earnhardt would end up 13 laps behind. Edwards was still in the lead when the caution came out. Kenseth took over the lap during the caution, and Edwards retook it within a lap. Kenseth recaptured the lead at lap 70.

Green flag pitstops started on lap 105. However, on lap 107, well before the green flag pitstops had cycled, a caution came out for debris. Joe Nemechek led on the restart on lap 116. Dave Blaney hit the wall on lap 143 leading to the third caution, with Nemechek still leading over Johnson. At the restart on lap 151, Nemechek was leading from Mark Martin and Jimmie Johnson with 26 cars on the lead lap. Within a lap, Johnson was second.

Another caution came out on lap 161 when Kasey Kahne went into the wall. At the restart, Johnson led over Nemechek, but after a three-car tussle for the lead, Nemechek led on lap 166. However, Nemechek's success was short-lived: around lap 180, engine problems saw him fall down the leader board and he had to retire. Edwards took over the lead. Harvick then took over with about 55 laps to go.

With 48 laps to go Michael Waltrip’s engine blew, bringing out the 6th caution, and when the green came out with 41 laps to go, Harvick was leading in front of Kenseth and Gordon. With 34 laps to go, the 7th caution came out because Jason Leffler was in trouble. Most of the leaders pitted, but cars that stayed out took the first six places on the restart, led by Kurt Busch. The race restarted with 29 laps to go.

With 25 laps to go, Busch and Biffle pulled out into a 2-second lead, vying together for first place. Greg Biffle finally retook the lead on lap 228 and kept it to win the race ahead of Jimmie Johnson and Kurt Busch, with only 0.525 of a second separating the top three men.

Race results

Race Statistics
 Time of race: 3:34:45
 Average Speed: 
 Pole Speed: 
 Cautions: 7 for 40 laps
 Margin of Victory: 0.231 sec
 Lead changes: 26
 Percent of race run under caution: 16%         
 Average green flag run: 26.2 laps

References

Auto Club 500
Auto Club 500
NASCAR races at Auto Club Speedway